Kasaba Bay Airport  is a rural airport serving Nsumbu National Park on Lake Tanganyika in the Northern Province in Zambia.

The airport is on a narrow isthmus between two bays. Approach and departures are over the water.

See also

Transport in Zambia
List of airports in Zambia

References

External links
OurAirports - Kasaba Bay
OpenStreetMap - Kasaba Bay Airport

Airports in Zambia
Buildings and structures in Northern Province, Zambia